League of Communist Youth of Yugoslavia, commonly known in English as the Young Communist League of Yugoslavia, or simply Communist Youth, was the youth wing of the Communist Party of Yugoslavia from 1919 to 1948. Although it was banned just two years after its establishment and at times ruthlessly prosecuted, it continued to work clandestinely and was an influential organization among revolutionary youth in the Kingdom of Yugoslavia, and consequently became a major organizer of Partisan resistance to Axis occupation and local Quisling forces. After World War II, SKOJ became a part of a wider organization of Yugoslav youth, the People's Youth of Yugoslavia, which later became the League of Socialist Youth of Yugoslavia.

History

Original SKOJ 
SKOJ was founded in Zagreb on October 10, 1919 as a political organization of revolutionary youth the youth which followed the policy of the communist Socialist Workers' Party of Yugoslavia.

Regional committees were originally established but they were abolished in 1920. In 1921, the organization was banned together with the party, which had in the meantime been renamed Communist Party of Yugoslavia. Two congresses were held clandestinely during the 1920s, the Second Congress in June 1923, and the Third Congress in June 1926. SKOJ was affiliated to the Young Communist International. Regional committees were reestablished in 1939.

Seven Secreaties of SKOJ 
Seven Secretaries of SKOJ, also known as Seven Courageous, were seven leading figures of the organization, between 1924 and 1931, who died at the hand of the government, in direct confrontation with the gendarmerie, suicide, or indirectly as a consequence of being subjugated to extremely poor conditions during imprisonment and/or torture, which lead to their death from extreme weakening and illness. The Seven were, in sequence of taking the role of a secretary of the organization: 
 Zlatko Šnajder (1903, Slavonski Brod), organisation secretary between 1924-1926; imprisoned 1926; while in prison he was tortured suffering numerous beatings before he was finally released in May 1931, but died three months later of tuberculosis.
 Mijo Oreški (1905, Zagreb), organisation secretary between 1926-1928, and again as political secretary with Mišić as organisation secretary between January 1929-July 1929; both were killed in shooting exchange with gendarmerie on 27 July 1929.
 Pavle Pajo Marganović (1904, Kovin u Vojvodini), political secretary between 1928-April 1929; died from the consequences of torture 30. July 1929.
 Josip Debeljak (1902, Orešje u Hrvatskom zagorju), organisation secretary between 1928-April 1929, and again between August 1930-October 1931; he was the last of the seven to head the organisation, and he was also killed in shooting with gendarmerie on 15 October 1931 in Zagreb. 
 Janko Mišić (1900, Slani Dol kod Samobora), organisation secretary with Oreški as political secretary between January 1929-July 1929; both were killed in shooting exchange with gendarmerie on 27 July 1929.
 Josip Kolumbo (1905, Kutjevo), political with Popović as organisation secretary between July 1929-August 1930; both committed suicide on 14 Augusta 1930 after falling into gendarmerie trap.
 Pero Popović Aga (1905, Užice), organisation with Kolumbo as political secretary between July 1929-August 1930; both committed suicide on 14 Augusta 1930 after falling into gendarmerie trap.

During the WWII 
After Axis powers occupied Yugoslavia in 1941, SKOJ organized a united youth front with the program of struggle against fascism and war, Anti-Fascist Youth Committees which at the Congress of Anti-Fascist Youth of Yugoslavia in Bihać in 1942 united into the Unified League of Anti-Fascist Youth of Yugoslavia (Ujedinjeni savez antifašističke omladine Jugoslavije - USAOJ). SKOJ became a part of the umbrella organization, but continued to act autonomously within it.

Post-WWII socialist Yugoslavia 
In May 1946, USAOJ was renamed People's Youth of Yugoslavia (Narodna omladina Jugoslavije - NOJ), and in 1948 SKOJ and NOJ were united into a single organization, which continued to use the name People's Youth of Yugoslavia, and the use of the name SKOJ was discontinued.

NOJ was later renamed League of Socialist Youth of Yugoslavia (Savez Socijalističke Omladine Jugoslavije - SSOJ). This disintegrated together with Yugoslavia in early 1990s.

Legacy 
The Slovenian branch was transformed into the Liberal Democracy of Slovenia, one of the major Slovenian parties.

After the dissolution of Yugoslavia, the New Communist Party of Yugoslavia founded a youth wing with the same name in 1992.

References

Sources 

League of Communists of Yugoslavia
Youth wings of communist parties
Youth wings of political parties in Yugoslavia
Youth organizations established in 1919
Organizations disestablished in 1990